{{Infobox CBB Team
| name = Indiana State Sycamores
| current = 2022–23 Indiana State Sycamores men's basketball team
| logo = Indiana State Sycamores logo.svg
| logo_size = 200
| university = Indiana State University
| firstseason = 1896
| athletic_director = Sherard Clinkscales
| conference = Missouri Valley Conference
| location = Terre Haute, Indiana
| coach = Josh Schertz
| tenure = 2nd
| arena = Hulman Center
| capacity = 9,000
| nickname = Sycamores
| studentsection = The Forest
| NCAAchampion = 1950†
| NCAArunnerup = 1946†, 1948†, 1968*, 1979
| NCAAfinalfour = 1946†, 1948†, 1949†, 1950†, 1953†, 1968*, 1979 
| NCAAeliteeight = 1942†, 1946†, 1948†, 1949†, 1950†, 1953†, 1968*, 1979 
| NCAAsweetsixteen = 1942†, 1946†, 1948†, 1949†, 1950†, 1953†, 1967*, 1968*, 1979 
| NCAAroundof32 = 1967*, 1968*, 1979, 2001
| NCAAtourneys = 1942†, 1943†, 1946†, 1948†, 1949†, 1950†, 1952†, 1953†, 1954†, 1959†, 1962†, 1963†1966*, 1967* 1968*1979, 2000, 2001, 2011*at Division II level† as NAIA member
| nit_champion =
| nit_runnerup =
| nit_finalfour = 
| nit_quarterfinal = 1978
| nit_secondround = 
| nit_appearance = 1977, 1978, 2013, 2014
| conference_tournament = 1979, 2001, 2011
| conference_season = 1930, 1946, 1947, 1948, 1949, 1950 (IIC) 1951, 1966, 1967, 1968 (ICC)1979, 2000 (MVC)| record = 1,563-1,344
| h_body = fn
| h_pattern_b = _thinsidesonwhite
| h_shorts = 224E92
| h_pattern_s = _blanksides2
| a_body = 224E92
| a_pattern_b = _thinwhitesides
| a_shorts = 224E92
| a_pattern_s = _whitesides
}}

Indiana State Sycamores basketball is the NCAA Division I men's basketball program of Indiana State University in Terre Haute, Indiana. They currently compete in the Missouri Valley Conference. The team last played in the NCAA Division I men's basketball tournament in 2011.

The Sycamores' first season was 1896, making them the oldest basketball team in the NCAA along with Bucknell, Minnesota, Washington and Yale; however, the records from 1896 to 1899 no longer exist. The Sycamores boast two College Players of the Year, 14 All-Americans, 41 1,000-point scorers, and 1,550+ victories. Their victory count places them in the top 70 of all NCAA Division I programs.

In addition, the Sycamores have 27 postseason appearances (7 NCAA, 4 NIT, 2 CBI, 1 CIT, 12 NAIA, and the 1936 Olympic Trials) with five national championship appearances (2 NCAA, 3 NAIA).  Seven Sycamores were members of the 1951 Pan-American Games gold medal-winning team.  The Sycamores' most memorable season was 1978–79, when unanimous National Player of the Year Larry Bird led an undefeated team to its first-ever NCAA Division I Tournament appearance, as well as the AP and UPI national titles.  However, it lost the national title game versus the Magic Johnson-led Michigan State team; and ended the season with a record of 33–1.  Their performance was the deepest run by a first-time participant in the Division I tournament, and one of only three times that a first-time team has advanced as far as the Final Four (UNCC in 1977 and Georgia in 1983).  They would not have another postseason appearance until 2000.

The Sycamores were the national runner-up in the NCAA College Division (now Division II) in 1968; they won the NAIA national championship in 1950, had NAIA Finals appearances in 1946 and 1948 and NAIA National semifinals appearances in 1949 and 1953. The Sycamores were led by All-Americans, Duane Klueh, Dick Atha, Lenny Rzeszewski, Butch Wade and Jerry Newsom.  As the program transitioned from NAIA to the NCAA, one final NAIA highlight was Ray Goddard leading the entire nation, in FT percentage (91.2%) during the 1961–62 season. Former Head Coaches include the legendary John Wooden, Purdue All-American Dave Schellhase, Indiana coaching legend Glenn M. Curtis and well-known college coaches such as Bob King, Royce Waltman, Tates Locke and Ron Greene.  Former assistants include collegiate head coaches such as Rick Ray (Mississippi State, Southeast Missouri), Rob Flaska (Centenary), Jim Saia (Cal State-Los Angeles), Stan Gouard (Indiana State-Evansville) and Benjy Taylor (North Central, Hawai'i and Tuskegee), Thad Matta (Butler, Xavier, Ohio State), Kareem Richardson (Missouri-Kansas City), Phil Hopkins (Western Carolina), Mel Garland (IUPUI), and NBA Great Mel Daniels.

The Indiana State Sycamores men's basketball team currently play their home games at The Hulman Center II (9,000).

Postseason

Division I NCAA tournament results
The Sycamores have appeared in four NCAA Division I Tournaments. Their combined record is 5–4.

NIT results
The Sycamores have appeared in four National Invitation Tournaments (NIT). Their combined record is 1–4.

CBI results
The Sycamores have received two College Basketball Invitational (CBI) berths. Their record is 0–1.

CIT results
The Sycamores appeared in one CollegeInsider.com Tournament (CIT). Their record is 0–1.

Division II NCAA tournament results
The Sycamores have appeared in three NCAA Division II basketball tournaments. Their combined record is 5–4.  They hosted the Great Lakes Regional during the 1966-67 Tournament.

NAIA Tournament results
The Sycamores appeared in the NAIA Division I men's basketball tournament 12 times. They reached the NAIA Final Four five times. The Sycamores combined NAIA Tournament record is 25–12. Indiana State is the only team to finish as the National Runner-Up in the NAIA and both the NCAA DI and DII tournaments.

Indiana State won 7 NAIA District 21 titles (1951, 1952, 1953, 1954, 1959, 1962 and 1963)

1936 Olympic trials
Coach Wally Marks’ 1935–36 Sycamores from Indiana State University gained national attention when they participated in the first national post-season collegiate basketball tournament. The winning team would earn the right to name five players to represent the United States in the 1936 Olympic Games in Berlin, the first Games to feature the American sport of basketball. By earning the bid, the Sycamores joined a select group of college teams hand-picked by the Amateur Athletic Union, the U.S. governing organization.

The Olympic team members were selected from the best AAU teams and winners of the national collegiate tournament conducted in eight regional districts. The Sycamores earned a bid and advanced to the district finals and were pitted against Coach Ray Meyer's DePaul Blue Demons, at Chicago Stadium, DePaul's home court. Despite vaulting to a 10–0 lead, maintaining a 16–10 halftime advantage and outscoring the hosts from the field, Marks’ cagers lost on a long shot in the waning moments of the game, 29–28.

1951 Pan American Games
The 1949–50 squad won the NAIA 1950 National Championship.  Subsequently, Coach John Longfellow and eight Sycamore players were invited to represent the United States in the inaugural (1951) Pan American Games, held in Buenos Aires, Argentina. Sycamores Roger Adkins, Dick Atha, Richard Babcock, Bob Gilbert, Tom Kern, Gene Lambdin, Ed Longfellow, and Cliff Murray represented the United States and Indiana State University.  The United States defeated the national teams of Ecuador (74–32),  Cuba (77–55),  Panama (90–55)  and Brazil (69–42) to reach the championship game against Argentina. The Americans defeated the hosts, (57–51), for the gold medal.

USA Basketball players (10)
 Roger Adkins – 1951 Pan American Games
 Dick Atha – 1951 Pan American Games
 Richard Babcock – 1951 Pan American Games
 Bob Gilbert – 1951 Pan American Games
 Tom Kern – 1951 Pan American Games
 Gene Lambdin – 1951 Pan American Games
 Ed Longfellow – 1951 Pan American Games
 Cliff Murray – 1951 Pan American Games
Larry Bird – 1977 World University Games
Larry Bird – 1978 World Invitational Tournament
Carl Nicks – 1979 Select Team.
Larry Bird – 1992 Olympic team, a.k.a. "The Dream Team"

Other national teams (2)
 DeCarsta Webster – Icelandic national basketball team (1984–1987)
 Manny Arop – Canadian University National Team (2013), Canadian Junior National Team (2011), Canadian U-19 National Team (2009), Canadian U-18 National Team (2008)

Arenas

Player of the year

National awards

National Player of the Year (2)
Duane Klueh – 1948 NAIB Player of the Year Helms Foundation
Larry Bird – 1979 consensus

Oscar Robertson Trophy (1)
Larry Bird – 1979

Naismith Award (1)
Larry Bird – 1979

John R. Wooden Award (1)
Larry Bird – 1979

Associated Press College Basketball Player of the Year (1)
Larry Bird – 1979

Adolph Rupp Trophy (1)
Larry Bird – 1979

Eastman Award (1)
Larry Bird – 1979

Joe Lapchick Award (1)
Larry Bird – 1979

The Sporting News (1)
Larry Bird – 1979

Basketball Times (1)
Larry Bird – 1979

Basketball Weekly (1)
Larry Bird – 1979

Conference (6)
Roger Adkins – 1952 Indiana Collegiate Conference
Butch Wade – 1967 Indiana Collegiate Conference
Jerry Newsom – 1968 Indiana Collegiate Conference
Larry Bird – 1978 Larry Bird Trophy
Larry Bird – 1979 Larry Bird Trophy
Nate Green – 2000 Larry Bird Trophy

National tournament (3)
Duane Klueh – 1948 NAIA Chuck Taylor Most Valuable Player
Lenny Rzeszewski –  1950 NAIA Chuck Taylor Most Valuable Player
Jerry Newsom – 1968 NCAA Division II Men's Basketball Championship Most Valuable Player

Retired numbers

Four Sycamore players have had their numbers retired by the school. Jerry Newsom is the latest, with his number 41 retired by the school on February 19, 2022.

All-Century Team
In 1899, basketball became a Sycamore tradition; in the first official game, State defeated the Terre Haute YMCA by a score of 20–17; in 1999, to recognize the first century of intercollegiate basketball, a panel selected the following All-Century Team.

In addition, 'All-Decade' teams were selected for the following:
1910s-1920s, 1930s, 1940s, 1950s, 1960s, 1970s, 1980s, 1990s

The rosters and more information can be found in the Winter 1999 (Volume 3, Number 1) issue of the 'Indiana State University Alumni Magazine.

All-Americans (14)

CoSIDA Academic All-Americans (4)
 Dan Bush (Second Team) 1972
 Mike Route (Third Team) 1976
 Greg Thomas (Second Team) 1993
 Matt Renn (Second Team) 2001

NCAA Post-Graduate scholarship (2)
 Dan Bush 1972
 Steve Reed 1981

All-Conference (35)
Only players selected for the conference first team are displayed; for second team and honorable mention, please consult the Indiana State Men's basketball media guide at www.gosycamores.com

All-Indiana Intercollegiate Conference (2)

All-Indiana Collegiate Conference (18)

All-Midwestern Conference (3)

All-Missouri Valley Conference (12)

Career leaders

Scoring

Three-pointers

Rebounds

Assists

 Steals 

 Blocked shots 

 A bronze statue of Larry Bird by sculptor Bill Wolfe was dedicated on November 9, 2013, prior to the annual men's basketball with Ball State University. The statue honors Bird's legendary status in the Holy Land of Basketball _ INDIANA.

Coaching leaders
The Sycamores have been led by 25 different Head Coaches through their history, the top 15 coaches; in terms of wins; are listed below.

Leaders in BOLD

 A bronze statue of Coach John Wooden by sculptor Blair Buswell will be dedicated when the newly renovated Pauley Pavilion reopens on October 26, 2012, and a men's basketball will be played at the UCLA arena between Indiana State and UCLA will be played on November 9, 2012. The game honors Wooden's coaching career at both schools.

Coach of the Year

National (1)
Bill Hodges – 1979 AP, UPI, The Sporting News.

Conference (8)
Kevin McKenna – 2010 Missouri Valley Conference: CollegeInsider.com
Royce Waltman – 2000 Missouri Valley Conference: League Media & Coaches
Tates Locke – 1991 Missouri Valley Conference: League Media & Coaches
Bill Hodges – 1979 Missouri Valley Conference: League Media & Coaches
Duane Klueh – 1959, 1963, 1966, 1967 Indiana Collegiate Conference: League Media & Coaches

Sycamores in the professional leagues

Draft history
 18 Indiana State players have been drafted by the BAA, NBA, ABL, ABA and NDBL.  Jerry Newsom was drafted by the Indiana Pacers of the original ABA in the 1968 ABA draft.  Ray Goddard was drafted by the Kansas City Steers in the 1962 ABL draft

NBA Regular Draft

NBDL Draft

ABA Draft

ABL Draft

Sycamores in the NBA

Fifteen former Sycamores have played in the NBA and its predecessors, the (NBL, the BAA), and the ABA. They are:
Dick Atha: 1955–56 – New York Knicks; 1957–1958 – Detroit Pistons
Ken Bannister: 1984–1986 – New York Knicks; 1987–1989 – Los Angeles Clippers
Larry Bird: 1979–1992 – Boston Celtics
George Chestnut: 1933–1937 – Indianapolis Kautskys
Doyle Cofer: 1948-49 - Detroit Vagabond Kings
Rick Darnell: 1975–1976 – Virginia Squires
John Hazen: 1948–1949 – Boston Celtics
Harold Johnson: 1946–1947 – Detroit Falcons
Duane Klueh: 1949–1950 – Denver Nuggets; 1950–1951 – Fort Wayne Pistons
Jake LaRavia: 2022-present - Memphis Grizzlies
John Miklozek: 1936–1937 – Indianapolis Kautskys
Carl Nicks: 1980–1982 – Denver Nuggets, Utah Jazz; 1982–1983 – Cleveland Cavaliers
George Pearcy: 1946–1947 – Detroit Falcons
Henry Pearcy: 1946–1947 – Detroit Falcons
Bob Royer: 1949–1950 – Denver Nuggets

NBA, ABA, BAA, NBL, Champions
Roy "Goose" Burris (1933) Akron Firestone Non-Skids
Larry Bird: (1981, 1984, 1986) Boston Celtics

Sycamores in other professional leagues
35+ Indiana State players have played in foreign leagues; DeCarsta Webster and Brad Miley both won titles in Iceland, David Moss, Jayson Wells, and Djibril Kante have each won multiple championships in European and South American leagues

 Jerod Adler – BBC Nyon – Basket-club Boncourt – Switzerland League A
 Manny Arop – Norrköping Dolphins – Sweden – Basketligan; Webmoebel Baskets – Germany – ProA; Niagara River Lions - National Basketball League of Canada
 Keenan Barlow – Dublin – Ireland – Premier League (Ireland)
 Jordan Barnes – Paderborn Baskets - Germany ProA (2021–2022); Giessen 46ers - Germany Bundesliga (2022-pres.)
 Kelyn Block – Lausanne MB – Switzerland League A; Nanterre 92, UJAP Quimper 29 - France; Premijer liga BiH
 Devonte Brown - Paderborn Baskets - Germany ProA (2017–18); OKK Sloboda Tuzla - Bosnia-Herzegovina Premijer liga BiH (2016–17)
 Aaron Carter – Grand Rapids Danger ABA
 Joshua Crawford - Ehime (2016–17), Kumamoto Volters (2015-16) Japan - B.League; MBK Baník Handlová (2014–15) Extraliga;  BC Nevėžis LKL (2014–15); BC Beroe (2013–14), BC Balkan (2011–12) NBL
 Jim Cruse – Diadolle Asptt Dijon – France N3
 Amani Daanish – Salon Vilpas Vikings – Finland – 1st Division
 Alex Gilbert - Played in the Úrvalsdeild karla and the Icelandic Division I in Iceland with Njarðvík (Iceland) and Grindavík
 Nate Green – Pallalcesto Amatori Udine (2007–08), Olimpia Milano (2006–07), Fortitudo Pallacanestro Bologna (2005–06), S.S. Felice Scandone (2003–05) – Italy Lega Basket Serie A; Columbus Riverdragons (2002–03), North Charleston Lowgators (2001–02) – USA – NBDL; Canberra Cannons Australia – National Basketball League (Australia) (2000–01)
 Lamar Grimes – Marinos de Bolivar BPC, BK Iskra Svit Extraliga; Al Jaysh Army SC – Qatar – D1
 Steve Hart - Fayetteville Patriots - (2001–02) – USA – NBDL
 Djibril Kante – Malvin Montevideo – Uruguay – LUB; Atenas Córdoba – Argentina – LigaA
 Jake Kelly – Texas Legends (2011–12)  PAOK – Greece  – Greek Basket League; 
 Jake Kitchell – Slavia TU Košice – Slovakia – SBL
 Winfred King - Nuova Pallacanestro Gorizia (Italy), CB Breogán, CB Collado Villalba (Spain), APU Udine, Pallacanestro Firenze (Italy), Maccabi Tel Aviv B.C. (Israel)
 Dwayne Lathan – BC Sukhumi Superliga (2017)  Rio Grande Valley Vipers – USA NBDL (2013–present); Osaka Evessa – Japan – bj league (2012–13)
 Brad Miley – With Valur (1980–1981) and Keflavík (1982–1983) in Iceland and with Geelong Supercats in Australia 1982
 Todd McCoy – Delaware Destroyers- USA EBA and NPBL
 Gabriel Moore – ETB Wohnbau Baskets Essen, Soba Dragons Rhoendorf – Germany – ProB
 Steve McWhorter - Den Bosch Basketball DBL
 David Moss – Basket Brescia Leonessa (2015-pres), EA7 Emporio Armani Milano (2013–2015), Montepaschi Siena – Italy – SerieA (2010–2013)
 Jake Odum – Banvit B.K. Turkey (2017–18); s.Oliver Würzburg (2016-2017); Medi Bayreuth (2015–2016); PAOK – Greece – GBL (2014–2015)
 Larry Sample - New York Nationals – (1972–76) – opponent/foil to Harlem Globetrotters
 Khristian Smith - SLUNETA Ústí nad Labem, NBL
 Paul Stroud – Washington Generals/New York Nationals – (1972–75) – opponent/foil to Harlem Globetrotters
 Matt Renn – Valence Condom Castera RGB – France – N2
 Emondre Rickman - Surrey Scorchers - United Kingdom (2020–21); S.C._Lusitânia - Portugal (2019–20)
 Devin Thomas - BMS Herlev Wolfpack - Denmark (2020–21)
 Myles Walker - Oliveirense - Portugal LPB
DeCarsta Webster – 20-year career in Iceland in the Úrvalsdeild karla and the Icelandic Division I (1979–1999)
 Jayson Wells – 13-yr career in foreign leagues; some teams include:  Poltava-Basket Poltava – Ukraine – Superleague; Maccabi Rishon - Israel Premier League
Christian Williams - Telstar Hesperange of the Total League
 Max Woolsey Boston Whirlwinds (1950–52) – United States – opponent/foil to Harlem Globetrotters
 Trent Wurtz – Musel Pikes – Luxembourg – Total League, Christchurch Cougars – New Zealand – NBL,

Basketball Hall(s) of Fame
Hall of Fame Sycamores

Thirty-two former Sycamores players and coaches have been inducted into various Halls of Fame; they are:

Basketball Hall of Fame (3)
John Wooden Player, 1961; Coach, 1973—The first person to be inducted as Coach & Player.
Larry Bird  Player, 1998
Mel Daniels Player, 2012 (Assistant Coach at Indiana State, 1976–1980)

National Collegiate Basketball Hall of Fame (2)
 John Wooden – 2006  (The Inaugural Class)
 Larry Bird – 2009

NAIA Hall of Fame (4)
 Duane Klueh – 1955
 Clemens 'Lenny' Rzewszewski – 1956
 John Longfellow – 1960
 John Wooden – 2009

National Small College Basketball Hall of Fame (2)
 Clarence Walker - 2018
 John Wooden - 2018

Missouri Valley Conference Hall of Fame (4)
 Larry Bird – 1997
 Duane Klueh – 2006
 John Wooden – 2009
 Bob King – 2014

In addition to the Conference Hall of Fame; the MVC selected an All-Centennial Team in honor of the Conference's 100th Anniversary;
the Sycamores had three players named to that team; Larry Bird, Carl Nicks and John Sherman Williams.

Indiana Basketball Hall of Fame (40)

Indiana State University Hall of Fame (42)
Individuals

Teams
1978–79 Men's Basketball Team (Inducted 1999) Larry Bird, Tom Crowder, Eric Curry, Alex Gilbert, Bob Heaton, Brad Miley, Carl Nicks, Rod McNelly, Rich Nemcek, Steve Reed, Bob Ritter, Leroy Staley, Scott Turner. Trainers: Bob Behnke, Rick Shaw. Head Coach: Bill Hodges. Assistant Coaches: Mel Daniels, Terry Thimlar. Graduate Assistant Coach: Danny King.
1949–50 Men's Basketball Team (Inducted 2000) Jim Berger, Richard Campbell, Dan Dimich, Bob Gilbert, Jim Hans, Buren Hooper, Max Hungerford, Bill Jagodzinski, Jerry Kunkel, Gene Lambdin, Ed Longfellow, Don McDonald, Dick Pattengale, Jim Powers, Jack Reece, Len Rzeszewski, John Scott, Clarence Walker. Managers: Stan Jacobs, John Sweet. Head Coach: John Longfellow. Assistant Coach: Max Andress.
1967–68 Men's Basketball Team (Inducted 2005) Daniel Chitwood, Michael Cooper, Ken Haas, Fred Hardman, Rodney Hervey, Steven Hollenbeck, Howard Humes, John McIntire, Richard Mason, Jerry Newsom, Gerald Novak, Mike Phillips, James Waldrip, Don Weirlich, Thomas Zellers. Head Coach: Gordon Stauffer. Assistant Coach: Melvin Garland.

Iowa High School Athletic Association Basketball Hall of Fame
 Greg Lansing

In popular culture
During the Quantum Leap episode, The Leap Home: Part 1 – November 25, 1969 (1990); the father of lead character Dr. Samuel Beckett'' (Scott Bakula) remarks that while "Sam will likely end up at Harvard, I know he's still hoping for a basketball scholarship from Indiana State."

References

External links

 
Basketball teams established in 1896
1896 establishments in Indiana